Otukpa is a town in Benue State, Nigeria. It contains the headquarters of the Ogbadibo Local Government Area.

Otuba means to gather together.  The name Otukpa is a symbol of Unity, Defence and friendship.

Background 
Three men; Oono, Oodo Ogodo and Ameh Ochagbaha coming from diverse directions in search of fortunes converged at a spot popularly known today as Oto. The men entered into a pact to stay together and forge their fortunes forward collectively. They decided on a suitable name for the area known today as OTUKPA.  The original name 'Otuba' which means "to gather or together” points to significant elements of unity among them.

The name Otukpa is a symbol of Unity, Defence and friendship. Otu-le-kpa, ugboga bo glan (Prof. Abimaje Akpa)

Anthony Inedu Ijika Akoto in his book titled The Making of Otukpa Land has the following to say about the name Otupka; "While writing on the etymology of the name “Otukpa” the works of Captain G.D.C. Money plays a pivotal edifying role. According to Money, Otukpa was formed from two Idoma words: ‘Oto’ a name of a village in the then settlement and ‘Ukpa” a sacred plant believed to contain medicinal properties and healing powers. It was in the mist of the plants ‘Ukpa’ in a village called ‘Oto’ that the elders of the three clans  Ai-Oono, Ai-Oodo and Ai-Ochagbaha had a convent and pact of love, friendship and defence. Oto and Ukpa became so symbolic among the people, hence the name ”Oto Ukpa” was combined to form OTUKPA." That is how the name 'Otupka' came into being.

Meanwhile, Otukpa people are known to be friendly with a very rich cultural heritage.

Early settlement 
The Ai-Oono, Ai-Oodo, Ai-Ochagbaha clans who occupy the area known today as Otukpa have had and practiced communal life system since their arrival to the present Otukpa. The clans occupy a portion of the present otukpa. The clans occupy a portion of the waterless ridge of hills which form the south –western portion of the Idoma division. The language of the people is Idoma. The whole area hitherto full of forest has gradually deforestated so as to give way to agriculture to support the increasing population. The only forest reserves in the vicinity of the villages are retained for purpose of defence, game and worship of deities. The communities live in compounds, each extended family occupying a separate stead.

Climate

In Otukpa, the rainy season is aggressive and overcast, the dry season is muggy and partly cloudy, and it is warm year round. January in Otukpa, is a heat season.

Towns in Nigeria
Populated places in Benue State